Oakum is a preparation of tarred fibre used to seal gaps. Its main traditional applications were in shipbuilding, for caulking or packing the joints of timbers in wooden vessels and the deck planking of iron and steel ships; in plumbing, for sealing joints in cast iron pipe; and in log cabins for chinking. In ship caulking, it was forced into the seams using a hammer and a caulking iron, then sealed into place with hot pitch.

It is also referenced frequently as a medical supply for medieval surgeons, often used along with bandages for sealing wounds.

History

Oakum was at one time recycled from old tarry ropes and cordage, which were painstakingly unravelled and reduced to fibre, termed "picking". The task of picking and preparation was a common occupation in prisons and workhouses, where the young or the old and infirm were put to work picking oakum if they were unsuited for heavier labour. Sailors undergoing naval punishment were also frequently sentenced to pick oakum, with each man made to pick  of oakum a day. The work was tedious, slow and taxing on the worker's thumbs and fingers. In 1862, girls under 16 at Tothill Fields Bridewell had to pick  a day, and boys under 16 had to pick . The oakum was sold for £4 10s ( in modern money) per hundredweight.

In modern times, the fibrous material used in oakum comes from virgin hemp or jute. In plumbing and marine applications, the fibers are impregnated with tar or a tar-like substance, traditionally pine tar (also called 'Stockholm tar'), an amber-coloured pitch made from pine sap. Tar-like petroleum by-products can also be used for modern oakum. "White oakum" is made from untarred material, and was chiefly used as packing between brick and masonry in pre-war home and building construction, as its breathability allows moisture to continue to wick and transfer.

Plumbing
Oakum can be used to seal cast iron pipe drains. After setting the pipes together, workers pack oakum into the joints, then pour molten lead into the joint to create a permanent seal. The oakum swells and seals the joint, the "tar" in the oakum prevents rot, and the lead keeps the joint physically tight. Oakum present in cast iron bell/spigot joints may also contain asbestos.
Today, modern methods, such as rubber seals (for example, gaskets or o-rings), are more common.

Literature
In Herman Melville's novella Benito Cereno, crew members of a slave ship spend their idle hours picking oakum.

Charles Dickens's novel Oliver Twist mentions the extraction of oakum by orphaned children in the workhouse. The oakum extracted is for use on navy ships, and the instructor says that the children are serving the country.

The Innocents Abroad, a travel book by Mark Twain, also mentions in chapter 37 a "Baker's Boy/Famine Breeder" who eats soap and oakum, but prefers oakum, which makes his breath foul and teeth stuck up with tar.

Jack London, in his book The People of the Abyss (1903), mentions picking oakum in the workhouses of London.

Robert Jordan, in Winter's Heart alludes to picking oakum as a punishment among the Sea Folk.

Joshua Slocum in Sailing Alone Around the World, describes caulking his ship the Spray, with oakum.

Guy de Chauliac in The Major Surgery of Guy de Chauliac, frequently cites oakum as a medical supply in his treatments of wounds.

References

Hemp products
Jute
Shipbuilding
Medicine
Surgery